Yanick is a given name. Notable people with the name include:

Yanick Dupré (1972–1997), Canadian professional ice hockey player
Yanick Lehoux (born 1982), Canadian hockey player
Yanick Paquette (born 1974), Canadian penciller in North American comics
Yanick Paternotte (born 1951), member of the National Assembly of France

See also
Yanick Dupre Memorial Award
Yannick

de:Yanick